A cuckoo is a bird of the family Cuculidae.

Cuckoo may also refer to:

Film and television
 Cuckoo (2009 film), a British film
 Cuckoo (2014 film), an Indian film
 Cuckoo (upcoming film), an American film
 The Cuckoo (film), a 2002 Russian film by Aleksandr Rogozhkin
 Cuckoo (TV series), a 2012 British comedy series

Music
 D'Cuckoo, an electronic percussion ensemble
 Cuckoo (album), an album by the British band Curve
 "The Cuckoo" (song), a folk song
 "Cuckoo" (Lissie song) (2010)
 "Cuckoo" (Netta song)
 "Cuckoo!", a song composed by Benjamin Britten included in Friday Afternoons
 "Cuckoo", a 2012 song by Adam Lambert from Trespassing
 "Cuckoo", a 2003 song by I Am Kloot from I Am Kloot
 "Cuckoo" a song by The Monks

Places
 Cuckoo, Virginia, an unincorporated settlement in Virginia
 Cuckoo (Mineral, Virginia), a historic house in Cuckoo, Virginia
 Cuckoo, Tasmania, a locality in Australia, death place of Arthur Triffitt

Vehicles
 HMS Cuckoo (1806), a 4-gun schooner
 HMS Cuckoo (1837), a wooden paddle packet transferred to the navy wrecked in May 1850 and again in December 1857
 HMS Cuckoo (1873), an Ant-class gunboat
 Sopwith Cuckoo, a World War I British biplane torpedo bomber

Other
 Cukoo or Cuckoo (1929–1981), Bollywood dancer and actress
 Cuckoo (game), a traditional card or board game 
 Cuckoo (sniper), a sniper disguised in a sprawling tree
 Cuckoo Electronics, a South Korean manufacturing firm
 Cuckoo Line, a railway in East Sussex, England
 Cuckoo Trail, a foot trail in East Sussex, England
 Cuckoo, a character in ClanDestine from Marvel Comics
 Cuckoo, a racer character in the Malaysian animated series Rimba Racer

See also
 Coo Coo (disambiguation)
 Cuckoo clock
 "Cuckoo, Cuckoo", a song by Animal Collective from Strawberry Jam
 Cuckoo hashing, a computer programming algorithm
 Cuckoo roller, a bird in a different order from the cuckoos
 Cuckoo Song (disambiguation)
 CuckooChess, a chess program by Peter Österlund
 Cuckooshrike, a bird of yet another order
 HMS Cuckoo, a list of ships of the Royal Navy
 KooKoo, a 1981 album by Debbie Harry
 The Cuckoo (disambiguation)
 The Cuckoos (disambiguation)
Sonny the Cuckoo Bird, the Cocoa Puffs mascot with the catchphrase "I'm cuckoo for Cocoa Puffs!"